Rally for Democracy and Progress may refer to:

Rally for Democracy and Progress (Benin)
Rally for Democracy and Progress (Chad)
Rally for Democracy and Progress (Gabon)
Rally for Democracy and Progress (Mali)
Rally for Democracy and Progress (Namibia)
Rally for Democracy and Progress (Niger)

See also
RDP (disambiguation)